Tynbayevo (Tımbay) is a rural locality (a village) and the administrative centre of Tynbayevsky Selsoviet, Mishkinsky District, Bashkortostan, Russia. The population was 397 as of 2010. There are 8 streets.

Geography 
Tynbayevo is located 47 km northwest of Mishkino (the district's administrative centre) by road. Izimarino is the nearest rural locality.

References 

Rural localities in Mishkinsky District